Turks and Caicos Islanders of African descent or Black Turks and Caicos Islanders are Turks and Caicos Islanders who are of African descent.

As of 2013, people of African descent are the majority ethnic group in the Turks and Caicos Islands accounting for around 87.6% of the territory's population.

History

The first recorded African slaves were brought to Turks and Caicos by the Bermudans to work in the salt ponds. The next large introduction of African slaves came when American Loyalist fled the United States after the War of Independence, setting up plantations on the Turks and Caicos Islands. In 1788 the Caicos Islands had a population of over 40 white families and 1200 slaves.

References and footnotes 

African
 
Ethnic groups in the Turks and Caicos Islands
People of African descent